In mathematics, integrals of inverse functions can be computed by means of a formula that expresses the antiderivatives of the inverse  of a continuous and invertible function  in terms of  and an antiderivative of   This formula was published in 1905 by Charles-Ange Laisant.

Statement of the theorem
Let  and  be two intervals of  
Assume that  is a continuous and invertible function. It follows from the intermediate value theorem that  is strictly monotone. Consequently,  maps intervals to intervals, so is an open map and thus a homeomorphism. Since  and the inverse function  are continuous, they have antiderivatives by the fundamental theorem of calculus.

where  is an arbitrary real number. Note that it is not assumed that is differentiable.

In his 1905 article, Laisant gave three proofs.  First, under the additional hypothesis that  is differentiable, one may differentiate the above formula, which completes the proof immediately.  His second proof was geometric.  If  and  the theorem can be written: 

The figure on the right is a proof without words of this formula. Laisant does not discuss the hypotheses necessary to make this proof rigorous, but this can be proved if  is just assumed to be strictly monotone (but not necessarily continuous, let alone differentiable). Laisant's third proof uses the additional hypothesis that  is differentiable. The right-hand side is calculated using integration by parts to be  and the formula follows.

On the other hand, even though general monotonic functions are differentiable almost everywhere, the proof of the general formula does not follow, unless  is absolutely continuous.

It is also possible to check that for every  in  the derivative of the function  is equal to  In other words:

Examples
Assume that  hence  The formula above gives immediately 
With  and

History
Apparently, this theorem of integration was discovered for the first time in 1905 by Charles-Ange Laisant, who "could hardly believe that this theorem is new", and hoped its use would henceforth spread out among students and teachers. This result was published independently in 1912 by an Italian engineer, Alberto Caprilli, in an opuscule entitled "Nuove formole d'integrazione". It was rediscovered in 1955 by Parker, and by a number of mathematicians following him.
The general version of the theorem, free from this additional assumption, was proposed by Michael Spivak in 1965, as an exercise in the Calculus, and a  fairly complete proof following the same lines was published by Eric Key in 1994.
In 2013, Michael Bensimhoun, estimating that the general theorem was still insufficiently known, gave two other proofs: The second proof, based on the Stieltjes integral and on its formulae of integration by parts and of homeomorphic change of variables, is the most suitable to establish more complex formulae.

Generalization to holomorphic functions
The above theorem generalizes in the obvious way to holomorphic functions:

Because all holomorphic functions are differentiable, the proof is immediate by complex differentiation.

See also 

 Integration by parts
 Legendre transformation
 Young's inequality for products

References

 

Calculus
Theorems in analysis
Theorems in calculus